Thomas M. Matukewicz (born August 5, 1973), also known as "Coach Tuke", is an American football coach. He is the head football coach at Southeast Missouri State University. Matukewicz was formerly the defensive coordinator coach at the University of Toledo. Previously, he served as an assistant coach under Jerry Kill from 2000 to 2010 with three different schools. He was also the interim head coach for Northern Illinois during the 2010 Humanitarian Bowl.

Head coaching record

*Interim head coach for bowl game.

References

External links
 Southeast Missouri State profile

1973 births
Living people
Emporia State Hornets football coaches
Fort Hays State Tigers football coaches
Northern Illinois Huskies football coaches
Pittsburg State Gorillas football coaches
Southeast Missouri State Redhawks football coaches
Southern Illinois Salukis football coaches
Toledo Rockets football coaches
Coffeyville Red Ravens football coaches
Fort Hays State University alumni
Pittsburg State University alumni
People from Shawnee County, Kansas
Sportspeople from St. Joseph, Missouri